This article provides a list of entertainment events that were held at the Rod Laver Arena. The busiest indoor arena in Victoria have hosted many entertainment events from many local, regional and international artists; spanning a wide range of musical genres. All events are arranged in an chronological order.

1987 - 2000

2001 - 2010

2011 - 2020

2021 - present

References 

Australian entertainment-related lists
Entertainment events in Australia
Events in Melbourne
Lists of events in Australia
Entertainment events at Rod Laver Arena
Lists of events by venue